Little Sparrow was the working title of a planned American biographical drama film based on the life and career of American entertainer Madonna, who was set to direct and co-write the film with Erin Cressida Wilson from a previous draft by Diablo Cody. However, the film production was postponed in January 2023.

Plot 
In a press release, Universal Filmed Entertainment Group chairwoman Donna Langley stated that the film will focus on Madonna's music career as well as the "broader, unvarnished story" of her life.

Production

Background 

In 2016, filmmaker Elyse Hollander's Blonde Ambition script for a biopic centered on Madonna's early career was the highest-voted project on that year's Black List ranking of the best unproduced Hollywood screenplays. Universal Pictures acquired rights to Hollander's screenplay in April 2017, with Brett Ratner, Michael De Luca, and John Zaozirny of Bellevue Productions attached as producers. Later that month, Madonna expressed disapproval over Universal's handling of the project in an Instagram post, stating “only I can tell my story. Anyone else who tries is a charlatan and a fool looking for instant gratification without doing the work. This is a disease in our society.”

Development 
Madonna teased collaboration on a screenplay with screenwriter Diablo Cody via Instagram video in August 2020. The following month, she formally announced that she would direct the biopic for Universal and would co-write the screenplay with Cody, with Amy Pascal set to produce. In an Instagram Live, the singer revealed several plot details and confirmed that while the film would not be a movie musical, the actress portraying Madonna would sing her songs in a diegetic fashion. Cody later departed from the project after turning in a final draft, with Erin Cressida Wilson stepping in as co-writer.

In an October 2021 interview on The Tonight Show Starring Jimmy Fallon, Madonna claimed to have rejected several male-led attempts to create a movie about her life, and that her project would allow her to tell her own story with a woman's perspective.

Madonna revealed the film's working title, Little Sparrow, on Instagram in February 2022. That July, she described the script as "very long" to Variety, noting she was currently in the process of "whittling down" the material. On January 24, 2023, it was reported that development has been a struggle, as none of the many drafts of the scripts was under 180 pages. This led conversations among insiders about perhaps splitting the movie in two parts or making it into miniseries.

Casting 
A March 2022 article in The Hollywood Reporter detailed the months-long audition process for the lead role, which involved 11-hour choreography sessions with Madonna's choreographer for the top contenders. Actresses considered included Florence Pugh, Alexa Demie, Julia Garner, Odessa Young, Emma Laird, Barbie Ferreira and Sydney Sweeney, along with singers Bebe Rexha and Sky Ferreira. Actress Julia Fox met with Madonna earlier that year to discuss the role of Debi Mazar, actress and longtime friend of the singer. On June 8, 2022, it was announced that Garner has been offered the role of Madonna. Stuart Heritage from The Guardian, called "one of the most berserk audition processes in motion picture history".

Postponement 
On 24 January 2023, the film was confirmed to be placed on hold, with Madonna opting to instead focus on the Celebration Tour, her upcoming world tour.

See also 
 Madonna: Innocence Lost, an unauthorized 1994 television film based on the life of Madonna.

References 

Cancelled films
Universal Pictures films
Films about Madonna
Films with screenplays by Diablo Cody
Films directed by Madonna
American biographical drama films
Cultural depictions of Madonna
Biographical films about singers
Films set in the 1980s
Films set in the 1990s
Biographical films
Unreleased American films
Films with screenplays by Madonna